Quentin N'Gakoutou Yapéndé (born 10 May 1994) is a Central African professional footballer who plays as a forward for Championnat National 2 club Romorantin.

Club career
A youth player of Monaco, Ngakoutou gained first-team playing time on loan at Arles-Avignon in 2014, where he made his professional debut in a 0–0 Ligue 2 draw against Ajaccio. After a short experience in Switzerland with Lausanne, Ngakoutou was loaned again in Ligue 2 to Evian in July 2015. After a relatively good season with Evian, in July 2016, he went on trial with Ligue 1 side Bastia but did not convince the club. In January 2017, he went on trial at EFL League One side Bolton Wanderers but did not convince the club and on 31 January 2017, he was loaned for six months to Belgian second division side Union Saint-Gilloise. In July 2017, he went on trial at Belgian second division side Cercle Brugge but failed to convince the club and stayed at Monaco for one more season. On 1 July 2018, his contract with Monaco expired and he was released after seven years with the club.

After nearly two years without playing professional football, in July 2019, N'Gakoutou was tested in two clubs, he first went on trial at EFL League Two side Swindon Town and after with the French fourth division team Annecy but did not convince either of the two clubs and ended up signing a one-year contract with the French fifth division club Bourges 18, where he scored 5 goals in 10 matches before the COVID-19 pandemic permanently interrupted competition in France.

In January 2022, N'Gakoutou signed for French club Romorantin.

International career

N'Gakoutou was born in the Central African Republic to a Central African father and Gabonese mother, and moved to France at a young age. He is a former youth international of France, but in September 2018, the 24-year-old made his international debut for his country of birth, the Central African Republic in the 2019 Africa Cup of Nations qualification match against Guinea on 9 September 2018.

Personal life
N'Gakoutou is the brother of Gabon international footballer Yannis N'Gakoutou.

Career statistics

References

External links

Quentin Ngakoutou foot-national.com Profile

1994 births
Living people
People from Bangui
Central African Republic footballers
Central African Republic international footballers
French footballers
France youth international footballers
Central African Republic people of Gabonese descent
Sportspeople of Gabonese descent
French sportspeople of Central African Republic descent
French sportspeople of Gabonese descent
Central African Republic emigrants to France
Naturalized citizens of France
Association football forwards
French expatriate footballers
Central African Republic expatriate footballers
Red Star F.C. players
AS Monaco FC players
AC Arlésien players
FC Lausanne-Sport players
Thonon Evian Grand Genève F.C. players
Royale Union Saint-Gilloise players
Bourges 18 players
Football Club 93 Bobigny-Bagnolet-Gagny players
SO Romorantin players
Championnat National 2 players
Ligue 2 players
Swiss Challenge League players
Championnat National 3 players
Black French sportspeople